Wojas is a surname. Notable people with the surname include: 

Claire Wojas (1949–2018), Canadian screenwriter and film producer
Michael Wojas (1956–2010), owner and proprietor of The Colony Room Club, London
Pamela Smart (née Wojas, born 1967), American convicted criminal

See also
Rojas